The chestnut-headed crake (Rufirallus castaneiceps) is a species of bird in subfamily Rallinae of family Rallidae, the rails, gallinules, and coots. It is found in Bolivia, Brazil, Colombia, Ecuador, and Peru.

Taxonomy and systematics

The chestnut-headed crake's taxonomy is unsettled. The International Ornithological Committee (IOC) and BirdLife International's Handbook of the Birds of the World (HBW) place the chestnut-headed crake in genus Rufirallus with the russet-crowned crake (R. viridis). The South American Classification Committee of the American Ornithological Society and the Clements taxonomy place it in genus Anurolimnas with the russet-crowned crake and black-banded crake (A. fasciatus). The IOC places the latter species in genus Laterallus and HBW places it in genus Porzana.

The worldwide taxonomic systems agree that the species has two subspecies, the nominate R.(or A.) c. castaneiceps and R.(or A.) c. coccineipes.

Description

The sexes are alike. Adults' bills have a mostly black maxilla that is greenish below the nostrils and a greenish mandible with a black tip. The nominate subspecies' forecrown, sides of the head and neck, and breast are bright rufous. Their throat is orange-rufous or light buff. Their crown, back, rump, wing coverts, belly, and vent area are brownish olive. Their legs and feet are dull brown or olivaceous. Immatures are duller; they are brown or brownish olive where the adult is rufous and their throat is pale grayish buff. Subspecies R. c. coccineipes has red legs and feet but very similar plumage to the nominate. Some authors state that it has greener (less brown) upperparts and tawny tones to the rufous areas, but others find no significant difference between the subspecies.

Distribution and habitat

The nominate subspecies of chestnut-headed crake is found from southern Colombia south through eastern Ecuador into northern Peru. Its southern limit in Peru is the left bank of the Rio Napo and in Ecuador it is the same or perhaps somewhat beyond it. R. c. coccineipes is found from the Rio Napo (or vicinity) in Ecuador and Peru south into extreme northwestern Bolivia. A separate population is found in Brazil's Acre state. The species inhabits humid landscapes with a dense understory such as secondary forest, where it especially favors overgrown agricultural plots in tropical evergreen forest. Unlike most others of its family, it can be found far from water.

Behavior

Movmement

The chestnut-headed crake is a year-round resident throughout its range.

Feeding

The chestnut-headed crake forages by probing debris and rotten wood and flicking aside leaves while walking on the ground. It also pecks at similar substrates above the ground by stretching up. Its diet has not been documented but is assumed to be invertebrates and seeds.

Breeding

Almost nothing is known about the chestnut-headed crake's breeding biology. Its nesting season appears to include June.

Vocalization

The chestnut-headed crake has a loud melodic song described by one author as "a long (lasting up to 5 min) series of tri- or bisyllabic whistles: wee-hoohoo wee-hoohoo wee-hoohoo ...". Its aggressive call is "a quiet puttering sound".

Status

The IUCN has assessed the chestnut-headed crake as being of Least Concern, though its population size is not known and is believed to be decreasing. No immediate threats have been identified. It is considered uncommon in most of its range but "benefits from low levels of human disturbance, taking advantage of edge habitats around small garden plots."

References

Rufirallus
Birds of the Amazon Basin
Birds of the Colombian Amazon
Birds of the Ecuadorian Amazon
Birds of the Peruvian Amazon
Birds of the Bolivian Amazon
chestnut-headed crake
Taxonomy articles created by Polbot
Taxa named by Philip Sclater
Taxa named by Osbert Salvin